A petronel is a 16th and 17th century black powder muzzle-loading firearm, defined by Robert Barret (Theorike and Practike of Modern Warres, 1598) as a horsemans peece. It was the muzzle-loading firearm which developed on the one hand into the pistol and on the other into the carbine. The name (French petrinel or poitrinal) was given to the weapon either because it was fired with the butt resting against the chest (French poitrine, Latin pectus) or it was carried slung from a belt across the chest. Petronels are found with either matchlock or wheellock mechanisms.

The sclopus was the prototype of the petronel. The petronel is a compromise between the harquebus and the pistol. Early petronels date back to the end of the 14th century, with a crude buttstock. Generally the touch hole is on the right side, and fired by a separate slow match. Sometimes they had small hinged plate covers to protect the priming from moisture. By extension, the term petronel was also used to describe the type of light cavalry who employed the firearm. The petronel (cavalryman) was used to support the heavy cavalry such as demi-lancers and cuirassiers. The petronel was succeeded by a similarly armed cavalryman called the harquebusier.

Later developments

Although petronels had fallen out of use in Europe by 1700, similar guns were made in the Middle East until the late 19th century. Afghan horsemen used a gun that was midway between an oversized pistol or a miniature carbine, with a curved buttstock designed to keep the weapon close to the rider's chest.

Gallery

See also 

 Moukahla, North African musket
 Jezail, Afghan musket
 Musketoon, weapon with shorter barrel than a musket
 Carbine

Notes

References 

Demmin, Auguste (1894). An illustrated history of arms and armour: from the earliest period to the present time. New York: George Bell.

Attribution

Early firearms